Super Sprint (known as Sprint Master on the Atari 2600) is a racing video game released by Atari Games and Midway Games in 1986. Up to three players drive Formula One-like cars on a circuit that is viewed from above. The game is a successor to Gran Trak 10 and the Sprint series, which were black-and-white games from the 1970s. A sequel, Championship Sprint, was released later in the same year.

Gameplay

Up to three players drive simultaneously on a circuit against opponents controlled by the computer. The circuits are viewed from above and always fit on the screen, so the game never scrolls. After three laps the winner advances to the next circuit. There are eight circuits in total, but the game only ends if gamers can get to race 85 where the bonus Super Speedway circuit is played . As the player goes to higher levels, more and more obstacles appear on the track, like oil puddles and tiny moving tornadoes. If the car touches them, the player loses control over the car for a short time while it is sliding and spinning. Driving into a wall with high speed or falling from one of the bridges destroys the car, but a helicopter will appear to replace it.

The car can be customized by collecting wrenches that lie on the track. The player can exchange three of them for improved traction, better acceleration or higher top speed.

Ports

Super Sprint was ported to the Amstrad CPC, Atari ST, Commodore 64, and ZX Spectrum. An unlicensed port was released by Tengen, a subsidiary of Atari, for the Nintendo Entertainment System and it was adapted by the Japanese company Altron as a licensed title for the Japanese market.

The game was ported to the Atari 2600 under the name Sprint Master, the adaptation was released in 1988.

Reception
In Japan, Game Machine listed Super Sprint on their August 15, 1986 issue as being the second most-successful upright/cockpit arcade unit of the month. It became Japan's eighth highest-grossing upright/cockpit arcade game during the latter half of 1986, and the ninth highest-grossing upright/cockpit arcade game of 1986. It was later Japan's tenth highest-grossing upright/cockpit arcade game of 1987.

In 1996, Next Generation listed the arcade version as number 59 on their "Top 100 Games of All Time". They explained that while the massive understeer in the game is highly unrealistic, it adds a sense of urgency to the gameplay.

Legacy

Championship Sprint

Later in 1986 Championship Sprint was released; it is almost identical, but with different tracks, and with a standard-size two-player cabinet instead of Super Sprint's wide 3P cabinet. It was ported to the ZX Spectrum, Amstrad CPC, and Commodore 64.

Rereleases
A Game Boy Advance version was released along with Spy Hunter in a dual-game pack in 2005.

Super Sprint is included in the compilation Midway Arcade Treasures for the GameCube, PlayStation 2, Xbox, and Microsoft Windows. Its sequel, Championship Sprint, was released for the same systems in Midway Arcade Treasures 2, and as a downloadable game for the PlayStation 3. The game is also part of the 2012 compilation Midway Arcade Origins for PlayStation 3 and Xbox 360.

In 2016, Super Sprint was re-released in the Lego Dimensions Midway Arcade Level Pack.

References

External links
 
 Super Sprint at Arcade History
 
 Championship Sprint at Arcade History

1986 video games
Amstrad CPC games
Arcade video games
Atari arcade games
Atari ST games
Commodore 64 games
Midway video games
Multiplayer and single-player video games
Nintendo Entertainment System games
Racing video games
Tengen (company) games
Unauthorized video games
Top-down racing video games
Video games scored by Brad Fuller
Video games developed in the United States
ZX Spectrum games